Nadine Panchita Marshall (born 30 September 1972) is an English television, stage, and radio actress.

Education and career
She studied at Rose Bruford College of Speech and Drama and is best known for her performance as Sally in the British television sitcom, The Smoking Room. Marshall has acted in Debbie Tucker Green's play Random and her film Second Coming (2014). She played the character Vron in the Sky Living television sitcom The Spa, with fellow The Smoking Room actress Debbie Chazen.

Filmography

Film

Television

Stage

References

External links 
 

Living people
1972 births
Black British actresses
English film actresses
English radio actresses
English stage actresses
English television actresses